Kind of Blue: A Political Memoir is a memoir by British Conservative politician Kenneth Clarke, published on 6 October 2016 by Macmillan. It accounts his forty-six years as the MP for Rushcliffe and his Cabinet roles during that time, under Prime Ministers Margaret Thatcher, John Major and David Cameron. The book was met with various reviews from critics.

References 

2016 non-fiction books
Political memoirs
British memoirs
Books about politics of the United Kingdom
Macmillan Publishers books